Edwin L. Cox (a.k.a. Ed Cox; October 20, 1921 – November 5, 2020) was an American businessman and philanthropist.

Early life
Edwin Lochridge Cox Sr., was born in Mena, Arkansas. He spent his first two undergraduate years at Southern Methodist University and received an M.B.A. from the Harvard Business School.

Career
He spent his career in oil and gas exploration. He served as CEO of the Edwin L. Cox Company, an investment company. He served on the board of directors of Halliburton and the American Petroleum Institute. In 1990, he was inducted into the Texas Business Hall of Fame.

Philanthropy
He was a major donor to the Republican Party, and to the campaigns of Presidents George H. W. Bush and George W. Bush. He was also a major donor to the George H.W. Bush Presidential Library and Museum on the campus of Texas A&M University in College Station, Texas.

He served on the board of trustees of Southern Methodist University from 1973 to 1987, including as its chairman from 1976 to 1987. The Cox School of Business at Southern Methodist University is named for him. He served on the trustees council of the National Gallery of Art in Washington, D.C., the Library of Congress Trust Fund and the board of trustees of the Dallas Museum of Art.

Personal life
Cox lived in a US $40 million mansion in Highland Park, Texas, a wealthy enclave of Dallas.

The large collection of French impressionists (Gustave Caillebotte, Cézanne and Van Gogh) compiled by Cox was auctioned off by the heirs at Christie's in 2021.

References

External links
YouTube: Cox School of Business Benefactor, Edwin L. Cox
YouTube: Ed Cox 90th Birthday Party at SMU Cox School of Business

People from Mena, Arkansas
People from Highland Park, Texas
Southern Methodist University alumni
Harvard Business School alumni
20th-century American businesspeople
21st-century American businesspeople
Halliburton people
American Enterprise Institute
Businesspeople from Arkansas
Businesspeople from Texas
20th-century philanthropists
21st-century philanthropists
American art collectors
1921 births
2020 deaths